Occacaris oviformis is an extinct nektonic predatory arthropod from the Lower Cambrian Maotianshan shale Lagerstätte.  It bears a superficial resemblance to the Cambrian arthropod, Canadaspis, though, was much smaller, and had a pair of "great appendages", with which it may have grasped prey. It was originally considered to belong to Megacheira, however it is questioned in later study.

It had a bivalved carapace that covered most of its body, leaving only the last two tergites of its trunk, with the telson jutting out of the posterior end of the carapace, and the eyes, antennae (possibly isolated endopod), and great appendages jutting out of the anterior end. The spines of the great appendages are paired, setting it apart from Forfexicaris valida and megacheirans like Fortiforceps foliosa.

Suggestions have been made that Occacaris is closely related to megacheirans, or to mandibulates.

See also

 Arthropod
 Cambrian explosion
 Chengjiang biota
 List of Chengjiang Biota species by phylum

References

Footnotes

General references
 

Prehistoric arthropod genera
Cambrian arthropods
Maotianshan shales fossils